Marin Gopov (born April 20, 1939) is a Bulgarian sprint canoer who competed in the early 1960s. He finished sixth in the C-2 1000 m event at the 1960 Summer Olympics in Rome.

References
Sports-reference.com profile

1939 births
Bulgarian male canoeists
Canoeists at the 1960 Summer Olympics
Living people
Olympic canoeists of Bulgaria
Place of birth missing (living people)
20th-century Bulgarian people